The Mosque Katip Sinan Qelebi, also known as "Katip Çelebi", is located on the Adem Jaschari Street in Prizren, Kosovo. Katip means "secretary" in Turkish. It may be named after Katip Çelebi but it also may be named like the Plaošnik mosque in Ohrid, which was named after Sinaneddin Yusuf Çelebi, short form Sinan Çelebi, from the Ohrizâde family.

It was supposedly built in 1591. It was repaired in 1893–94 based on an inscription.

Notes

References 

Mosques in Prizren
Ottoman mosques in Kosovo
1590s establishments in the Ottoman Empire
1591 establishments in Europe
Cultural heritage monuments in Prizren District